Alan Edwin Gowling (born 16 March 1949) is an English former footballer who played as a forward for several clubs in the north of England.

Playing career

Club
Born in Stockport, Cheshire, Gowling went to Manchester United by way of county schools and Manchester University, where he studied for a degree in economics. He played for Manchester United juniors while at university, and once scored seven goals in a 'B' game. Due to his degree, he earned the nickname "Bamber", after Bamber Gascoigne, the host of University Challenge.

Gowling made a goalscoring league debut against Stoke City. Coincidentally, he also played his last game for Manchester United against Stoke City, coming on as a substitute for Bobby Charlton. He played 87 times for Manchester United and scored four in a game against Southampton on 20 February 1971. Nevertheless, Gowling was never really a first choice player at the club, and he enjoyed his longest run in the side when playing in midfield in his final season in 1971–72. He was sold to Huddersfield Town for £65,000 in June 1972.

After a disappointing period at Huddersfield that resulted in two relegations, he joined Newcastle United as a strike partner for Malcolm Macdonald. At Newcastle, he scored their only goal in the 1976 League Cup Final defeat at the hands of Manchester City. Nicknamed the "Galloping Chip", the workmanlike Gowling was preferred by Gordon Lee to the stylish Macdonald, scoring 30 goals in 92 league appearances before moving to Bolton Wanderers in 1978. He retired from football in 1984, aged 36, after a period at Preston North End.

International
Gowling gained England caps at amateur, schoolboy and under-23 level. Gowling represented the British Olympic side in the qualifying tournament for the 1968 Summer Olympics.

After football
After his retirement, Gowling worked as general manager of a chemicals company in Buxton, Derbyshire.

Career statistics

References

1949 births
Living people
English footballers
England under-23 international footballers
English Football League players
Association football forwards
Footballers from Stockport
Alumni of the University of Manchester
Manchester United F.C. players
Huddersfield Town A.F.C. players
Newcastle United F.C. players
Bolton Wanderers F.C. players
Preston North End F.C. players